Tobias Schadewaldt (born 20 September 1984 in Wilhelmshaven) is a German sailor. He competed at the 2012 Summer Olympics in the 49er class.

References

German male sailors (sport)
Living people
Olympic sailors of Germany
Sailors at the 2012 Summer Olympics – 49er
1984 births
People from Wilhelmshaven
Sportspeople from Lower Saxony